Times Square Building may refer to the following buildings:
 The Times Square Building (formerly known as The New York Times Building), the Times headquarters on 43rd Street from 1913 to 2007
 Times Square Building in Seattle, WA (formerly the Times Building), formerly housed editorial operations of the Seattle Times newspaper
 Times Square Building (formerly the Genesee Valley Trust Building) in Rochester, NY